Kruger Mpumalanga International Airport  is located  north east of Mbombela in Mpumalanga, South Africa. Construction began in 2001, and it replaced the smaller Nelspruit Airport. It  now serves travelers to Kruger National Park. There are scheduled passenger flights to other South African cities as well as regional destinations. As of November 2022, German low-cost carrier Eurowings Discover will commence operations between its Frankfurt-hub and Kruger-Mpumalanga via Windhoek, Namibia.

The airport terminal, although small, is roofed almost entirely by thatch, making it the largest thatched structure in Africa, covering approximately 7,350m2.

Airlines and destinations

Eurowings Discover flights operates via Windhoek. The airline has fifth freedom rights between Windhoek and Kruger Mpumalanga.

Aeronautical Information
The Airport is equipped with an CAT 1 ILS on runway 05 with co-located DME. There is also a NDB and a recently installed DVOR.

Traffic statistics

External links
Official website

References

 Data current as of October 2006.

Airports in South Africa
Mbombela
Transport in Mpumalanga
Buildings and structures in Mpumalanga